In semiotics, poiesis  (from ) is "the activity in which a person brings something into being that did not exist before."

Etymology
Poiesis is etymologically derived from the ancient Greek term ποιεῖν, which means "to make". It is related to the word poetry, which shares the same root. The word is also used as a suffix, as in the biological term hematopoiesis, the formation of blood cells.

Overview
Aristotle's Poetics focuses on tragedy, also includes discussion of lyrical and epic poetry, and mention of comedy.

Martin Heidegger refers to poiesis as a 'bringing-forth' (physis as emergence), using this term in its widest sense. He explained poiesis as the blooming of the blossom, the coming-out of a butterfly from a cocoon, the plummeting of a waterfall when the snow begins to melt. The last two analogies underline Heidegger's example of a threshold occasion: a moment of ecstasis when something moves away from its standing as one thing to become another. (These examples may also be understood as the unfolding of a thing out of itself, as being discloses or gathers from nothing [thus nothing is thought also as being]). Additional example: The night gathers at the close of day. Plato's Symposium and Timaeus have been analyzed by modern scholars in this vein of interpretation.

In their 2011 book, All Things Shining, Hubert Dreyfus and Sean Dorrance Kelly argue that embracing a "meta-poietic" mindset is the best, if not the only, method to authenticate meaning in our secular times: "Meta-poiesis, as one might call it, steers between the twin dangers of the secular age: it resists nihilism by reappropriating the sacred phenomenon of physis, but cultivates the skill to resist physis in its abhorrent, fanatical form. Living well in our secular, nihilistic age, therefore, requires the higher-order skill of recognizing when to rise up as one with the ecstatic crowd and when to turn heel and walk rapidly away." Furthermore, Dreyfus and Dorrance Kelly urge each person to become a sort of "craftsman" whose responsibility it is to refine their faculty for poiesis in order to achieve existential meaning in their lives and to reconcile their bodies with whatever transcendence there is to be had in life itself: "The task of the craftsman is not to generate the meaning, but rather to cultivate in himself the skill for discerning the meanings that are already there."

See also
Allopoiesis, a process whereby a system can create something other than itself
Autopoiesis, the ability of a system to recreate itself
Mythopoeia, the act of creating a contrived mythology
Practopoiesis, a kind of adaptive system, a theory of adaptive organization of living systems
Acheiropoiesis
Esthesic and poietic

References

External links

Overview of Plato's Symposium
Original Transcript of Symposium

Greek words and phrases
Semiotics